"How You Like Me Now?" is a song by English rock band The Heavy. It was released as the third single from their second studio album The House That Dirt Built in August 2009. The song samples "Let a Woman Be a Woman" by Dyke and the Blazers. The song has been used in media several times and peaked at number 122 on the Billboard Hot 100. The band also released another version of the song, featuring The Dap-Kings Horns.

Composition
Singer Kelvin Swaby said the song is about "when you can take advantage of a situation, and it doesn't matter what you do. I'm trying to say that I've been really, really, really bad, you shouldn't love me after all. And I'm telling you I've done this and this and this, so how do you like me now? And it's almost like you're just being cocky with it, because you know that you can do it."

Usage in media
"How You Like Me Now?" has been used in media an unusually large number of times, making it the band's signature song. It has been featured in several trailers and movies. It was used in the HBO series Entourage and trailers for the 2012 movie Ted and The Transporter Refueled, during the closing credits for Horrible Bosses and in its sequel Horrible Bosses 2, in The Fighter when Mickey Ward (Mark Wahlberg) and Dicky Eklund (Christian Bale) walk on a road in the intro of the film, in This Means War when Tuck (Tom Hardy) and Lauren (Reese Witherspoon) play paintball, and in G.I. Joe: Retaliation. It was also used in an episode of the TV series Suits and White Collar. The song was also featured in the 2016 Warner Bros. animated film Storks, in which it is sung by Pigeon Toady (played by Stephen Kramer Glickman), and in the 2019 Netflix animated film Klaus. and netflix "Preacher".

The song was featured in a 2010 advertisement called "Sock Puppets"  introducing the newly redesigned Kia Sorento SUV. It has also been used in the 2011 action adventure racing game Driver: San Francisco, in the closing credits for the 2012 role-playing first-person shooter Borderlands 2 and 2013 platform game Knack on the PlayStation 4, and in a TV spot for the 2013 animated movie Turbo. It was also featured in the ski film Attack of La Niña. In 2014 the song was featured on the in-game soundtrack of the racing game Forza Horizon 2 for Xbox One on the fictional radio station Ninja Tune Radio (as well as in the soundtrack of the game's standalone expansion Forza Horizon 2 Presents Fast & Furious for Xbox One and Xbox 360) and the official trailer of the comedy series Girl Meets World on Disney Channel in Southeast Asia. It also appeared in the multi-platform racing game The Crew on the fictional radio station 11 FM. It appeared at the end of "Social Psychology" in season 1 of the TV show Community. It also appeared in the ninth episode of the second season of White Collar, and in "The Originals", the twentieth episode of the fourth season of The Vampire Diaries.

A remix of the song features in the video game LittleBigPlanet 3 while the original version appears near the end of the level "High Stakes Heist".

The song was also used as the theme song for Intentional Talk on MLB Network from the show's April 4, 2011 debut to April 1, 2016. A variant of this song called "How Do You Like Me Now (Beats Mix)" was performed by The Heavy and was prominently featured in the 2010 installment of Sony's venerable baseball video game franchise MLB The Show.

Beginning in the 2015-16 NHL season, the Vancouver Canucks played "How You Like Me Now" during home games at Rogers Arena whenever Radim Vrbata scored a goal, as part of their usage of personalized goal songs for each player. "How You Like Me Now" was selected for Vrbata's goal song in a fan vote, and was played during his goal celebrations up until his retirement in the 2017-18 NHL season.

In 2020, NASCAR used the song in promo commercials for the 2020 Daytona 500.

The song is currently played in Great American Ballpark whenever a member of the Cincinnati Reds hit a home run, replacing The Whip by Locksley.

Track listing

10-inch EP
 "How You Like Me Now? EP"

12-inch Remixes
 "How You Like Me Now? Remixes"

Charts

References

2009 songs
2009 singles
The Heavy (band) songs
Soul songs
Song recordings produced by Jim Abbiss